M. Joseph Ahrens is an American entrepreneur, scientist, and inventor whose work focuses on research, product development, business development, and operations in agriculture and food industries.

Career 

Since 2007, Ahrens has served as the vice president, scientific affairs of ATM Metabolics LLC which is dedicated to the discovery of treatments for metabolic and neurological disorders based on phytochemical platforms.

As the senior vice president, technology & business development with United Power Company LLC, (2007–2011), Ahrens served as the company's senior subject matter expert for technology, biomass, alternative/renewable energy systems, agronomic production, cropping systems, and equipment utilization.

While director of science & technology at Solution Health Systems, (2004–2005) Ahrens led the initial development of four new products and helped launch the Grapefruit Solution, which was at the time one of GNC's (General Nutrition Centers, Inc.) highest-selling food supplements.

As the director of scientific research for the Florida Department of Citrus (2001–2004), Ahrens oversaw seven product launches, including Grapefruit Slush, which was introduced at Epcot during the International Food and Wine Festival and remains Disney World's top-rated beverage introduction. Other products include Citrus Clean, a postharvest fungicide/cleaner; a method to reduce physical defects in grapefruit; a citrus peeling machine; a method to determine production area of citrus adapted over to potatoes; and a means to count citrus acreage using satellite imaging.

While at the FDOC, Ahrens oversaw the initial organization and establishment of the Center for Food-Drug Interaction Research and Education, a collaboration between the University of Florida’s College of Pharmacy and Tufts University School of Medicine.

Ahrens was a founding partner and director of agriculture of Freshconsult Ges.m.b.H, Salsburg, Austria (1992–1997), where he established permanent shipping channels in the countries of Mali, Belarus, and Brazil; led construction of the first inland refrigerated container terminal on the continent of Africa in Bamako, Mali; and implemented McDonald's warehousing system in the former USSR. Freshconsult was acquired by Royal Dutch Shell in 1997.

As the extension specialist in perishables at the University of California, Davis (1989–1994), Ahrens developed handling and packaging systems for multiple fresh and fresh-cut products, including fresh-cut peeled baby carrots.

Inventions and patents 

 Composition and method for treating diabetes and metabolic disorders. Ahrens and Thompson. Patent Application Pub. 20080234364. 
 Composition and method for the treatment of neurological disorders. Thompson and Ahrens. Patent Application Pub. 20090298932.

Education 

 PhD in Horticulture (Plant Physiology), minor in Tropical Agriculture, University of Florida, 1989
 MS in Horticulture (Postharvest Technology & Food Science), minor in Botany, University of Florida, 1985
 BS in Agriculture (Animal Physiology), University of Tennessee, 1981

Books 

 The Grapefruit Solution: Lower Your Cholesterol, Lose Weight and Achieve Optimal Health with Nature’s Wonder Fruit (LINX Corp., 2004), with Daryl L. Thompson

References

External links 
 ATM Metabolics

Living people
American scientists
Year of birth missing (living people)
American businesspeople
American inventors